The Lisbon–Porto high-speed rail line is a proposed high-speed rail line in Portugal, linking its capital Lisbon to its second-largest city Porto in Iberian gauge.

Background

High-speed rail in Portugal was planned in the 1990s and formally announced in 2005, which included the Lisbon–Madrid high-speed rail line, a Lisbon to Porto line and a line from Porto to Vigo, Spain. The plan was cancelled in 2009 due to the economic downturn.

In 2020 the plan was reactivated as part of an initiative by the Portuguese government to invest €43 billion into infrastructure projects by 2030. The line is projected to cost of €4.5 billion, with a proposed 75 minute journey time between the two cities.

Construction
The project will be split into three phases, with the first phase being the section from Porto to Soure, which is planned to be complete by 2028. The second phase will be the section between Soure and Carregado, which is projected to be finished by 2030. The third phase involves building a small section between Carregado and Lisbon, and is planned to be complete only later than 2030.

The rail network will be able to connect Lisbon to Porto with speeds as high as 300km/h, and in a total travel time of 75 minutes without stops, and 105 minutes with stops.
The new high-speed line will have stops in Leiria, Coimbra, Aveiro, Vila Nova de Gaia, apart from the already mentioned in Lisbon-Santa Apolónia and Porto-Campanhã.
In most of the cities, the current stations will be expanded to service the new high-speed line, except in Vila Nova de Gaia, where a new station will be built, called Gaia-Santo Ovídio. To cross the river Douro between Porto and Gaia, a new bridge will be built over the river. 

There are also plans to connect Porto to Vigo by high-speed rail, with a line departing from Porto-Campanhã, through Francisco Sá Carneiro Airport and Braga, and ending in Vigo. These plans are less concrete and are expected to be finished only later than 2030.

See also
 High-speed rail in Portugal
 Lisbon–Madrid high-speed rail line
 Porto–Vigo high-speed rail line

References

Rail transport in Portugal